PGC 1 is a radio galaxy located about 1.1 billion light-years away in the constellation Pisces.

Physical characteristics
PGC 1 appears to have a companion galaxy called SDSS J235958.29+004208.6. However, the difference in the recessional velocities for the two galaxies corresponds to about 55 million light years difference in distance, so it is possible that they may not be a physical pair, but however they are essentially the same distance.

Radio Jet
PGC 1 has a radio jet coming out of its center.

See also 
 Principal Galaxies Catalogue

References

External links 

Galaxies
Pisces (constellation)
1
Radio galaxies